RVG is an Australian band from Melbourne.

History
In October 2017, RVG released A Quality of Mercy. The record was made live at Melbourne pub The Tote, and was released without any fanfare on their Bandcamp page.

In April 2020, RVG released their second album, Feral.

In February 2023, RVG released "Nothing Really Changes", the first single from the band's second studio album. Brain Worms is scheduled for release on 2 June 2023

Discography

Singles

Awards and nominations

AIR Awards
The Australian Independent Record Awards (commonly known informally as AIR Awards) is an annual awards night to recognise, promote and celebrate the success of Australia's Independent Music sector.

|-
| rowspan="4"| 2017
| rowspan="3"| A Quality of Mercy
| Best Independent Album
| 
|-
| Independent Breakthrough Artist
| 
|-
| Best Independent Hard Rock, Heavey or Punk Album 
| 
|-
| "A Quality of Mercy"
| Best Independent Song
| 
|-

Music Victoria Awards
The Music Victoria Awards, are an annual awards night celebrating Victorian music. The commenced in 2005.

|-
| rowspan="4"| 2017
| A Quality of Mercy
| Best Album
| 
|-
| "A Quality of Mercy"
| Best Song
| 
|-
| rowspan="2"| themselves
| Best Band
| 
|-
| Best Emerging Talent
| 
|-
| rowspan="1"| 2019
| Romy Vager (RVG)
| Best Female Musician
| 
|-
| rowspan="5"| 2020
| rowspan="2"| Feral
| Best Album
| 
|-
| Best Rock/Punk Album
| 
|-
| "I Used to Love You"
| Best Song
| 
|-
| themselves
| Best Band
| 
|-
| Romy Vager (RVG)
| Best Musician
| 
|-
| 2021
| RVG
| Best Live Act
| 
|-

National Live Music Awards
The National Live Music Awards (NLMAs) are a broad recognition of Australia's diverse live industry, celebrating the success of the Australian live scene. The awards commenced in 2016.

|-
| 2017
| Romy Vager (RVG)
| Victorian Live Voice of the Year
| 
|-

References

Musical groups established in 2017
Australian musical groups
2017 establishments in Australia